Zafarobod may refer to:

 Zafarobod, a town in Tajikistan
 Zafarobod, Navoiy, Uzbekistan
 Zafarobod, Jizzakh Region, Uzbekistan